Marllon Gonçalves Jerônimo Borges (born 16 April 1992), simply known as Marllon, is a Brazilian footballer who plays as a central defender for Cuiabá.

Club career

Early career
Marllon was born in Rio de Janeiro, and started his youth career at Estácio de Sá after being released by Fluminense. After spells at Bangu and Cruzeiro, he joined Flamengo's youth setup in 2009.

On 21 January 2012, after returning from a failed loan at Duque de Caxias, Marllon made his senior debut by starting in a 4–0 home routing of Bonsucesso for the Campeonato Carioca championship. He made his Série A debut on 7 June 2012, playing the full 90 minutes in a 2–2 away draw against Ponte Preta.

Regularly used under Joel Santana, Marllon lost his space after the arrival of Dorival Júnior, and subsequently served loans at Boavista and Rio Claro, where he failed to impress. On 7 May 2014 he signed for Série B club Santa Cruz, after his contract with Flamengo expired. After again appearing rarely, he subsequently left the club and joined Capivariano.

Atlético Goianiense
On 26 May 2015, Marllon moved to Atlético Goianiense, also in the second level. An undisputed starter during the 2016 season, he contributed with two goals and 36 appearances as his side achieved promotion to the top tier as champions.

Career statistics

Honours
Flamengo
Campeonato Carioca: 2011

Atlético Goianiense
Campeonato Brasileiro Série B: 2016

Corinthians
Campeonato Paulista: 2018, 2019

Cuiabá
Campeonato Mato-Grossense: 2021, 2022

References

External links

1992 births
Living people
Footballers from Rio de Janeiro (city)
Brazilian footballers
Association football defenders
Campeonato Brasileiro Série A players
Campeonato Brasileiro Série B players
CR Flamengo footballers
Duque de Caxias Futebol Clube players
Boavista Sport Club players
Rio Claro Futebol Clube players
Santa Cruz Futebol Clube players
Capivariano Futebol Clube players
Atlético Clube Goianiense players
Associação Atlética Ponte Preta players
Sport Club Corinthians Paulista players
Cuiabá Esporte Clube players